Pennington, also called Cass River,  is an unincorporated community in Beltrami County, Minnesota, United States. Pennington has a post office with ZIP code 56663.

References

Unincorporated communities in Beltrami County, Minnesota
Unincorporated communities in Minnesota